The following list includes notable people who were born or have lived in Fargo, North Dakota.

Astronauts

Media

Musicians and singers

Sports

Statesmen (religious and political)

References

Fargo, North Dakota
Fargo